Sulla is a genus of flowering plants in the legume family, Fabaceae. It belongs to the subfamily Faboideae. It ranges from Siberia to the Mediterranean and North Africa.

Species 
Sulla comprises the following species:
 Sulla aculeolata (Munby ex Boiss.) Amirahm. & Kaz.Osaloo
 Sulla capitata (Desf.) B.H.Choi & H.Ohashi
 Sulla carnosa (Desf.) B.H.Choi & H.Ohashi
 Sulla coronaria (L.) Medik.
 Sulla pallida (Desf.) B.H.Choi & H.Ohashi
 Sulla spinosissima (L.) B.H.Choi & H.Ohashi
 subsp. capitatum 
 subsp. spinosissimum (L.) B.H.Choi & H.Ohashi

References 

Hedysareae
Fabaceae genera